William F. Jones (March 30, 1813 - October 27, 1890) was a Republican politician and both the fourth and sixth mayor of Muncie, Indiana. He also was a state representative, a member of the Muncie City Council, and the Muncie School Board. He is buried in Beech Grove Cemetery.

He was a resident of Ohio from 1832 to 1842 and Hartford City from 1842 to 1852.

His papers are at the Indiana State Library.

References

External links
William F. Jones papers, Rare Books and Manuscripts, Indiana State Library

1813 births
1890 deaths
Mayors of Muncie, Indiana
Republican Party members of the Indiana House of Representatives
19th-century American politicians